The Sumathi Best Teledrama Single Episode Award is presented annually in Sri Lanka by the Sumathi Group for the best Sri Lankan single episode in television.

The award was first given in 1995. Following is a list of the winners since then.

References

Episode
Performing arts awards